This is a list of placenames in Scotland which have subsequently been applied to parts of Australia by Scottish emigrants or explorers.

Australian Capital Territory

 Campbell (Robert Campbell)
 Duntroon
 Fraser
 Lawson
 Macgregor
 Macquarie (Lachlan Macquarie)
 Moncrieff
 Stirling

New South Wales

Aberdeen
Abermain
Abernethy
Appin
Armidale (Armadale), suburbs include "Ben Venue"
Balranald
Ben Lomond
Breadalbane
Buchanan
Campbelltown
Carabost
Cessnock
Dalgety
Dundee
Duns Creek
Fingal Bay (Fingal, Scottish form of Finn MacCool)
Fingal Head 
Galston
Glencoe
Glendale
Glen Innes and Glen Innes Severn Council
Glenmore (now called "Elsmore")
Hamilton
Inverell and Inverell Shire
Invergowrie
Largs
Lismore
Lithgow
Lochinvar
Lorn
Maclean
Maitland
Mossgiel
Mount Imlay
Lake Macquarie
City of Lake Macquarie
Balmoral, New South Wales
Macquarie Hills
Paterson (William Paterson (explorer))
Pitnacree
Scone
Scotland Island
Stuart Town
Sutherland
Sutherland Point
Sutherland Shire
Tweed River
Tweed Heads
Tweed Shire
Tweed Valley
Tweed Volcano
Suburbs of Sydney
Abbotford
Alfords Point
Airds
Annandale (Annandale)
Annangrove
Balmain and Balmain East
Balmoral
Blair Athol
Blairmount
Bonnyrigg and Bonnyrigg Heights
Busby
Campbelltown
Camperdown
Castlecrag (by architect Walter Burley Griffin, who named the suburb after a towering crag of rock overlooking Middle Harbour, known locally as Edinburgh Castle)
Cawdor
Clyde
Cowan
Davidson, suburb in the Northern Beaches area of Sydney and Electoral district of Davidson, a seat in the New South Wales Legislative Assembly
Doonside
Dundas and Dundas Valley
Elderslie
Erskineville
Glenmore Park
Glenorie
Macdonaldtown
Macquarie Fields, Macquarie Links and Macquarie Park
Melrose Park
Minto and Minto Heights
Mount Annan
Seaforth (Loch Seaforth, Isle of Lewis)
Smeaton Grange
Zetland

Northern Territory

Cape Crawford
Douglas / Daly Esplanade Conservation Area
Douglas Hot Springs (Tjuwaliyn) Nature Park
Glen Helen
Kintore
Kintore Caves Nature Park
MacDonnell Ranges
Lake Mackay
Point Stuart Coastal Reserve
Stuart Highway
Tennant Creek

Queensland

 Abbotsford
 Abercorn
 Abergowrie
 Airdmillan
 Airlie Beach
 Albany Creek 
 Alloway
 Alva, via Ayr 
 Aramac (R. R. Mackenzie)
 Argyll 
 Armstrong Beach
 Athol 
 Ayr
 Balgowan
 Ballandean
 Ballogie
 Balmoral Ridge
 Balnagowan
 Bannockburn
 Barcaldine
 Barlyne
 Birnam (Scenic Rim Region)
 Birnam (Toowoomba Region)
 Blairmore
 Bogie
 Bon Accord, Queensland (Bon Accord, slogan of Aberdeen)
 Braemore, Queensland
 Breadalbane, Queensland
 Brisbane (Thomas Brisbane)
 Auchenflower
 Balmoral
 Hamilton
 Kelvin Grove (Kelvingrove Park)
 Kenmore and Kenmore Hills
 MacGregor (William MacGregor)
 Mackenzie
 Robertson
 Burnside
 Cairns (of Irish origin)
 Bellenden Ker
 Buchan Point
 Glen Boughton
 Gordonvale
 Macalister Range
 Campbell Creek
 Campbells Pocket
 Charlestown
 Clinton
 Closeburn
 Colinton
 Conondale
 Cowan Cowan
 Craiglie
 Craigslea, now part of Chermside
 Cromarty
 Crossdale
 Dalbeg (Dail Beag)
 Shire of Dalrymple
 Dalrymple Heights
 Shire of Dalrymple (former)
 Deuchar
 Shire of Douglas
 Dundas
 Dysart
 Esk and Esk Island
 Fraser Island (Eliza Fraser)
 Glen Allyn
 Glenbar
 Glencoe
 Glendale
 Glenella
 Glen Isla
 Glenroy
 Glenwood
 Gordonstone
 Gowrie Junction
 Gowrie Mountain
 Grahams Creek
 Haigslea (Douglas Haig)
 Hamilton Island
 Hazeldean
 Irvinebank
 Jardine Islet
 Kennedy
 Kilbirnie
 Kilcoy
 Kilkivan
 Lamington
 Lammermoor
 Landsborough (William Landsborough)
 Logan City
 McEwens Beach
 Mackay (See John Mackay (Australian Pioneer))
Mackay Region
Mackay Harbour 
North Mackay 
Mackay City 
West Mackay 
South Mackay 
East Mackay 
North Mackay
 Maclagan
 Maleny
 Mitchell (Thomas Mitchell (explorer))
 Molendinar (Molendinar Burn in Glasgow)
 Morayfield
 Moreton Bay, Moreton Bay Region and Moreton Island (James Douglas, 14th Earl of Morton)
 Mount Dalrymple
 Murray Upper
 New Beith
 North Maclean
 Ormiston
 Pentland
 Port Douglas
 Ross River, principal river of Townsville
 Scotchy Pocket
 Sinclair Island
 Strathpine (Strath + pine)
 Tully
 Westmar

South Australia

Ardrossan
Balgowan
Bute
Cockburn
Edinburgh
Hamilton
Jamestown (James Fergusson)
Keith
Lochiel
Maitland
McLaren Vale
Melrose
Port Pirie
Stenhouse Bay
Stirling
Strathalbyn
Talisker Conservation Park (Talisker, Skye)
Adelaide Suburbs
Aberfoyle Park
Athol Park,
Blair Athol
Burnside (named 1839 by Peter Anderson, a Scots migrant)
Campbelltown
Craigmore
Edinburgh (RAAF Base Edinburgh)
Glenalta
Glenelg, Glenelg North and Glenelg South
Glengowrie
Glen Osmond
Glenside
Largs Bay and Largs North
McLaren Flat and McLaren Vale
Skye
St Kilda

Lobethal was known as Tweedvale for a number of years, due to the World Wars.

Tasmania

Aberdeen
Ben Lomond
Breadalbane
Calder
Campbell Town
Currie
Douglas River
Dysart
Elderslie
Fingal
Forth
Glen Dhu (Glen Dhu = Gleann Dubh - black glen)
Glengarry
Gordon
Gowrie Park
Gretna
Invermay
Killiekrankie
Lachlan
Leith
Macquarie and Macquarie Plains
Macquarie Island
Melrose
Mount Murchison (Tasmania)
Patersonia, an old name for Launceston.
Perth
Port Dalrymple (Dalrymple), the old name for George Town.
Strathblane
Upper Esk, North Esk River and South Esk River
Suburbs of Hobart-Glenorchy-
Firthside ("Firth")
Glenorchy & City of Glenorchy
Granton
Howden
Lauderdale
Montrose

Victoria

Aberfeldy
Bairnsdale (corruption of Bernisdale in Skye)
Balmoral
Bannockburn
Bonnie Doon
Buchan
Cardross
Cassilis
Clunes
Clyde
Dallas
Don Valley (Strathdon)
Donald
Dunkeld
Ensay
Fingal
Glenburn
Glenmaggie
Glenrowan
Glenthompson
Grampians National Park, home of the Grampian mountain range,
Hamilton
Invergordon
Inverloch
Jamieson
Kilmore
Lismore, Victoria
Loch
Lorne
Niddrie
Orbost
Rutherglen
St Andrews 
Scotsburn
Skye
Strathbogie
Strathmerton
Strathmore
Melbourne Suburbs
Abbotsford
Aberfeldie
Ardeer
Armadale
Arthurs Seat (Arthur's Seat)
Baxter
Blairgowrie
Cairnlea
Calder Park
Carnegie from Andrew Carnegie
Craigieburn
Dallas
Glen Eira
Glen Huntly
Glen Iris
Glen Waverley (tribute to Scott, cf Ivanhoe, Victoria)
Glenroy
Kilsyth
Knoxfield
Macleod
McCrae
McKinnon
Montrose
St Kilda and St Kilda East

Ivanhoe is named after the Walter Scott novel, Ivanhoe.

Western Australia

Albany (Albany an old name for Scotland, cf Alba)
Agnew
Lake Argyle
Balfour Downs
Bruce Rock
Carnegie
Erskine
Geikie Gorge
Glen Iris
Lake Mackay
Marvel Loch
Menzies
Murchison and Murchison River, Western Australia
Murray Street
Perth
Stirling Range
Perth Suburbs
Applecross
Ardross
Armadale and City of Armadale
Attadale
Bassendean
Brigadoon
Burns Beach
City of Cockburn and Cockburn Central
Craigie
Dalkeith
Duncraig
Eglinton
Hamilton Hill
Henderson
Kinross
Marmion
Murdoch
Port Kennedy
Queens Park
Stirling and City of Stirling

See also

 Scottish Australians
 List of place names of Dutch origin in Australia
 List of locations in Australia with an English name
 Locations in Australia with a Welsh name

References

Scottish
Scottish
Australia
Scottish-Australian culture